Sunrise Celebration is an ethical living, organic arts and music festival that used to take place in Bruton, Somerset, England on an organic farm and has now relocated to Pontrilas, Herefordshire.

History
The original concept was created by Daniel Hurring and Sun Bird in 2005, and the company Family Gathering was formed. The even began in 2006 over the summer solstice as an alternative celebration to the Glastonbury Festival that was taking one of its fallow years. It was originally called the Sunrise Summer Solstice Celebration, but dropped 'summer solstice' from the title in 2007 as the event's date moved to late May to avoid cross-scheduling with Glastonbury. The site in 2006-2008 was Bearley Farm in Bearley, approx.  north of Yeovil. Despite two successful events in 2006 and 2007 (boasting 6,000 - 8,000 attendees each year), the company lost £250,000 in this formative period, and closed as a result.

In 2008 the festival was cancelled due to extensive flash-flooding after a freak localized storm, although the organizers ran a smaller version of the festival later in the year as part of The Big Chill. As a result of the flooding and financial losses, Sunrise was reborn in 2009 on a site near Bruton, on organic farmland, considerably higher above sea level than the previous site. The event shrunk back down from 12,000 in 2008 to just 5,000 in 2009.

Sunrise saw its first financially stable year in 2009 under the management of Natural Communities Community Interest Company, a not-for-profit organization which raises funds for environmental and educational projects that continues to run the event to this day. The event grew to 7500 in 2010, and 9000 in 2011, with rave reviews each time. The 2010 event was run on behalf of The Inspiration Foundation charity. In 2011, the Natural Communities Foundation was set up as the official beneficiary of the festival, in order to achieve more of its charitable aims. That year Sunrise won The Guardian and Observer Newspapers' 'Ethical Travel Award' and The Green Parents 'Best Green Festival Award', and an 'Outstanding' mark with the organization 'A Greener Festival'.

The 2012 Sunrise Celebration festival returned to its original Summer Solstice dates for the first time since 2006. The event, in its 7th year, was dedicated to marking the important Solstice dates of the prophetic year of 2012 with a special one-off event on solstice night before the festival opened the next day.

In 2013, Sunrise Celebration renamed itself 'Sunrise Festivals Another World' and moved sites, this time over the border and into Wiltshire to Thoulstone Park, Chapmanslade.

2014 saw the festival return to its 'family gathering' roots, with the name Sunrise Celebration and much of the original content returning. The new site at Chepstow, just over the Welsh border, adjoins Chepstow Racecourse and is a country park a view over the Severn bridges. It lies adjacent to the beautiful Wye Valley walk.

Sustainability
The festival is powered by 100% renewable energy (including waste vegetable oil), has a site-wide organic food and drink policy and site-wide compost toilets, and is considered by many to be the United Kingdom's leading sustainable festival.

Activities
The festival includes five stages and acoustic and performance venues, including a large indoor stage, Chai Wallahs, three dance stages in the Sundance Arena and the Spit and Sawdust stage, hosting a mixture of folk, bluegrass and local up-and-coming bands. Over the years it has hosted stage productions from many of the best outfits in the alternative and underground festival scene.  The event includes a mix of alternative culture, with an eclectic musical blend of dub, world music, ska, electronica, dub-step, psy trance, breaks, reggae, folk music and Balkan beats; educational opportunities with Ecobuild, Transition Towns, and craft and technology areas; and is committed to best sustainable practice, with many of the festival's ground-breaking policies now being used by other mainstream festivals across the UK.

References

External links

Music festivals in Wales
Recurring events established in 2006
2006 establishments in England